Fig Tree Pocket is a riverside western suburb in the City of Brisbane, Queensland, Australia.

Lone Pine Koala Sanctuary is the oldest and largest koala sanctuary in the world. It is a tourist and education centre.

Geography
The suburb is located on a river pocket along the northern bank of Brisbane River. It is bounded to the east, south and west by the median of the river. The north-western boundary, the Centenary Motorway.

Sherwood Reach is the reach of the Brisbane River to the east of the suburb, while Mermaid Reach is to the west.

The suburb is zoned for very low density residential, low density residential and rural housing. Restrictions on multi-unit dwellings apply.  The majority of Fig Tree Pocket is rated "low risk" from bushfires.

The suburb is devoted mostly to low density housing with a large proportion of parks and low levels of noise pollution.

History

John Oxley explored the Brisbane River in November 1823. He named Mermaid Reach after HM Colonial Cutter Mermaid, which brought his exploration party to Moreton Bay.

The suburb takes its name from the Moreton Bay fig trees (Ficus macrophylla). In 1866, one particular fig tree in the area was photographed and described as able to shelter 400 people. The tree no longer exists but the circumstances of its disappearance are not known.

Fig Tree Pocket State School opened on 4 September 1871.

A post office opened in 1878.

Lone Pine Koala Sanctuary was established in 1927 by Claude Reid.

The Glenleighden School opened on 1 February 1979.

Brisbane Montessori School opened in 1982.

In early 2009, one luxury property sold for A$9.5 million and another sold for A$7.15 million.

The suburb was one of those in Brisbane which were affected during the 2010–11 Queensland floods. Following the 2010–11 Queensland floods, a riverfront estate sold for $8.25 million at Ningana Street in May 2014 which set a record for the highest price achieved after the natural disaster.

The median age of the Fig Tree Pocket population was 40 years of age, three years above the Australian median. 66.8% of people living in Fig Tree Pocket were born in Australia, which is very close to the national average of 66.7%. The other top responses for country of birth were England 6.2%, South Africa 4.0%, New Zealand 3.0%, United States of America 1.3%, and India 1.3%. 84.3% of people speak only English at home; the next most popular languages were Mandarin 1.7%, German 0.9%, Afrikaans 0.8%, Spanish 0.7%, and Hindi 0.7%. 47.5% of people aged 15 years and over in Fig Tree Pocket had completed a bachelor's degree or higher, which is significantly more than the national 22.0%. "No Religion" was the top response for religious affiliation, with 31.5% of the population. Catholic and Anglican were the next highest religious affiliations with 22.2% and 15.6% respectively.

Education 
Fig Tree Pocket State School is a government primary (Prep-6) school for boys and girls at Cubberla Street. In 2018, the school had an enrolment of 486 students with 39 teachers (30 full-time equivalent) and 19 non-teaching staff (11 full-time equivalent).

The Glenleighden School is a private primary and secondary (Prep-12) school for boys and girls at 33 Cubberla Street. It is operated by is operated by Speech & Language Development Australia and provides multi-disciplinary support for students with developmental language disorders.  In 2018, the school had an enrolment of 99 students with 13 teachers (11 full-time equivalent) and 34 non-teaching staff (28 full-time equivalent).

Brisbane Montessori School is a private primary and secondary (Prep-10) school for boys and girls at Mactier Street. In 2018, the school had an enrolment of 177 students with 22 teachers (15 full-time equivalent) and 16 non-teaching staff (6 full-time equivalent).

Fig Tree Pocket also has an early childhood centre and a community kindergarten.

There are no government secondary schools in Fig Tree Pocket. The nearest are Kenmore State High School in neighbouring Kenmore to the north-west and Indooroopilly State High School in neighbouring Indooroopilly to the north-east.

Amenities 
There are no stores of any kind, with the nearest major shopping complex being the Indooroopilly Shopping Centre.

Fig Tree Pocket has a  equestrian club at Fig Tree Pocket Road. It has a sand arena, cross-country course and polo field.

Fig Tree Pocket Riverside Reserve at 870 Fig Tree Pocket Road has a public boat ramp into the Brisbane River.

Transport 
The area is serviced by two Brisbane Transport bus routes – the 430 and the 445 – both of which have a terminus at Mandalay Park.

Attractions
Lone Pine Koala Sanctuary is at 708 Jesmond Road. It is the largest and oldest koala sanctuary in the world and operates as a tourist and education centre.

References

External links

 University of Queensland: Queensland Places: Fig Tree Pocket
 
 

Suburbs of the City of Brisbane